Slobodan "Slobi" Ogsananovic born in Belgrade, Socialist Federal Republic of Yugoslavia) is a retired professional footballer who played as a forward.

Ogsananovic has worked in many different roles since his retirement from playing football. He has worked as a head coach, assistant coach, a scout or with the youth systems at different teams and as a Sporting or football director or behind the scenes as a team manager. He also as worked for the Qatar Football Association and the Saudi Arabia Football Federation.

Ogsananovic as also worked in International football when he was the coach of the Jordan National team.

Footballers from Belgrade
Living people
Serbian footballers
Association football forwards
Year of birth missing (living people)